Jakob Lange is currently one of 23 partners at Danish architectural company Bjarke Ingels Group.

Lange is a board member at the American transportation company Virgin Hyperloop.

References 

Danish architects
1978 births
Living people